The 13th Rhythmic Gymnastics European Championships were held in Patras, Greece from 23 May to 25 May 1997.

Medal winners

Medal table

References 

1997 in gymnastics
Rhythmic Gymnastics European Championships